Hyundai's Epsilon engine is a category of small  inline gasoline automobile engines.

0.8 L (G3HA/G3HG)
The G3HA and G3HG engines are a 3-cylinder, 9 valves, SOHC,  version with a  bore and stroke. This engine has been used in Hyundai's new small hatchback Hyundai Eon. As the name suggests this engine is nothing but a G4HG engine with one fewer cylinders mainly designed for high fuel efficiency.

0.8 L (G4HA)
The G4HA is a 4-cylinder,  version with a  bore and stroke.

0.8 L LPG (L4HA)
The L4HA is a 4-cylinder,  LPG version with a  bore and stroke.

0.8 L TCI (G4HA)
The G4HA is a turbocharged 4-cylinder,  version with a  bore and stroke.

1.0 L (G4HC/G4HE)
The G4HC/G4HE is a 4-cylinder 3 valves per cylinder engine that displaces  with a larger  bore and stroke.

This engine has been used in Hyundai's Hatchback Atos/Santro.

This engine has been used in the Kia Picanto.

1.0 L LPG (L4HE)
The L4HE is a 4-cylinder,  LPG version with a  bore and stroke.

1.1 L (G4HD/G4HG)

The G4HD/G4HG is a 4-cylinder 3 valves per cylinder engine that displaces  with a larger  bore and stroke. This engine has been used in Hyundai's i10 (PA), Atos, Santro Xing cars and Kia Picanto. Firing Order of this engine is  1-3-4-2 & idle RPMs are 750± 100.

See also
 List of Hyundai engines

References 

Epsilon
Straight-three engines
Straight-four engines
Gasoline engines by model